Calvento Files is a Philippine crime and investigative documentary drama series which aired on ABS-CBN from December 1, 1995, to October 2, 1998. It was hosted by broadcast journalist Tony Calvento and was replaced by Katapat: Mayor Fred Lim.

This series is currently streaming on Jeepney TV YouTube Channel every 2nd quarter of the month, 5:00 pm together with Kapag May Katwiran... Ipaglaban Mo and Star Drama Theater Presents.

Movie version

In 1997, Star Cinema released a movie version of the show. It starred Diether Ocampo and Claudine Barretto in the "Balintuwad" (Upside Down) episode directed by Laurenti Dyogi, while John Estrada, Sharmaine Arnaiz and Cris Villanueva starred in "Inay, May Momo" (Mother, There's a Ghost) episode directed by Michael de Mesa.

Weekly series of Calvento Files

Awards

References

External links
 

ABS-CBN News and Current Affairs shows
ABS-CBN drama series
Philippine crime television series
Philippine documentary television series
1995 Philippine television series debuts
1999 Philippine television series endings
1997 films
Philippine crime drama films
Filipino-language television shows